Jonathan R. Jenkins (June 17, 1926 – June 30, 1999) was an American football tackle who played two seasons in the National Football League and All-America Football Conference with the Baltimore Colts and New York Yanks. He was drafted by the Philadelphia Eagles in the ninth round of the 1949 NFL Draft. He played college football at Dartmouth College and attended St. Christopher's Academy in Frostburg, Maryland.

References

External links
Just Sports Stats

1926 births
1999 deaths
Players of American football from Maryland
American football tackles
Dartmouth Big Green football players
Baltimore Colts (1947–1950) players
New York Yanks players
People from Frostburg, Maryland